From Pillar to Post was the first official release by Logan Lynn from Beat the World Records, a Caroline Records / EMI 3rd party label and was Lynn's first record to be released on a major label. A special pre-release and digital release was issued from Beat the World on September 4, 2009. This was followed by a physical release in selected stores, as well as a debut on iTunes, on November 24, 2009. The mass release in all stores nationwide happened in February 2010.

Digital Release (2009)

The album's title, From Pillar To Post, was borrowed from an expression that was commonly used by his maternal grandmother.  Lynn released a video for "Write It On My Left Arm" in August 2009.

On November 23, 2009, Logan Lynn released a music video for his new single, "Bottom Your Way to the Top".

"From Pillar to Post" was named Album of the Year by multiple media outlets in 2009, including The Deli, Indie Rock Cafe, Oregon Music News, MondoSonoro (Spain), GO Magazine, Just Out Portland and others.

Physical Release (2010)
The widespread physical release date for "From Pillar To Post", for all stores nationwide and select stores internationally, happened via Caroline Records/EMI in February 2010, alongside an international digital release.

Track listing

Release history

References

Logan Lynn albums
2009 albums